"Love Takes Time" is a song recorded by American singer-songwriter Mariah Carey for her eponymous debut studio album (1990). Written by Carey and Ben Margulies, while produced by Walter Afanasieff, the song was released as the second single from the album on August 22, 1990, by Columbia Records. An adult contemporary-influenced ballad, the song follows its protagonist lamenting the loss of a lover and confesses that "love takes time" to heal and that her feelings for her ex-lover remain.

Carey quickly recorded "Love Takes Time" at the last minute when the album was already considered complete and being processed for release. She played the song's demo to former Columbia CEO Don Ienner while on an airplane. Ienner and other officials immediately insisted the song be included on her upcoming album, even though the album was already going through final stages of completion and Carey wanted to save it for her sophomore effort. Eventually the song made it on to the album as the closing track, however, due to its late addition, it was not listed as such on early pressings of the album. Subsequent pressings of the album corrected this error.

"Love Takes Time" was well received by music critics and went to become another success from the album in North America. It became Carey's second number-one single in the United States, attaining the position for three weeks. However, the song did not replicate the success of its predecessor globally. A music video was provided for the song, filmed in black and white at a beach. "Love Takes Time" has been included on Carey's compilation album Greatest Hits (2001), as well as #1 to Infinity (2015), among others. "Love Takes Time" was heavily promoted in the US, being performed live on shows such as The Arsenio Hall Show, Mariah's Thanksgiving NBC Special and The Des O'Connor Show. Since its release, the song has been included on set lists of Carey's numerous concert tours and residencies.

Background
In 1988, a 19-year-old Carey moved out from her mother's house on Long Island into an apartment in Manhattan. She had composed a four-track demo tape with her writing partner Ben Margulies while she was attending high school. As 1988 progressed, Carey struggled to impress record executives with the tape and had failed in securing a record deal. She worked several jobs, including as a waitress and coat-checker, in order to pay for studio sessions with Margulies to make changes to the demo. After several months, Carey befriended singer Brenda K. Starr, and soon became one of her back-up vocalists. During recording sessions and rehearsals, Starr began to notice "glimpses" of Carey's "gifted" vocals. She thought that Carey was capable of achieving mainstream success and that she needed some guidance to break into the industry.

One evening, Starr took Carey to a record industry gala with hope of convincing a record executive to listen to Carey's demo. Jerry L. Greenberg, the president of Atlantic Records was interested in Carey, but as she handed him the tape, Tommy Mottola grabbed it, and said that he would tend to "the project". Mottola left the event later that evening, and got into his limousine and listened to the tape. He quickly realized that he had found a talented vocalist, turned the car around and returned to the party to find Carey, but she had already left. After a week of tracking her down through Starr's management, Mottola got in touch with Carey and brought her over to Columbia Records. After meeting with Carey and her mother Patricia for the first time, Mottola said: "When I heard and saw Mariah, there was absolutely no doubt that she was in every way destined for super-stardom." After a few brief meetings, Carey was signed to Columbia in December 1988.

Writing and recording
Carey's debut album was completed and being mastered when she wrote the song with Ben Margulies. Margulies said: "It was sort of a gospelish thing I was improvising, then we began working on it. It was on a work tape that we had...and we recorded a very quick demo. It was just a piano vocal demo - I played live piano, and she sang it."
Carey was on a mini-tour of ten states, playing acoustically with a piano player and three back-up singers. While on a company plane, she played the demo of "Love Takes Time" for Columbia Records president Don Ienner. "All the important guys were on the plane," Margulies said. "Tommy Mottola, Ienner, and Bobby Colomby." Carey was told the song was a "career-maker" and that it had to go on the first album. She protested, as her album was already being mastered and she intended the ballad for her next release.

The demo was sent to producer Walter Afanasieff. When Carey flew west to work with Narada Michael Walden on some tracks for her first album, Tommy Mottola and Don Ienner were impressed with Afanasieff's work and gave him an executive staff producer job with the label. Afanasieff recalled: "I guess to see if he made the right choice, [Mottola] called me up one day. He said, 'We've got this Mariah Carey album done, but there's a song that she and Ben Margulies wrote that is phenomenal, and I want to try everything we can to put it on the album.' I said, 'What do you want me to do?' and he said, 'You only have a couple of days, but are you ready to cut it?' I couldn't believe the opportunity that it was. I'd never produced anything by myself up until that time."

The demo was very close to what Mottola wanted the finished product to be, according to Afanasieff: "We cut the song and the music and the basics in about a day - and the only reason is this deadline. It was do it or we were gonna miss out on the whole thing. We got the tape and recorded everything and we got on the plane and went to New York [and] did her vocals. She did all the backgrounds, practically sang all night...We came back to the studio that afternoon, and we had to fix one line very quickly, and then [engineer] Dana Jon Chappelle and I got back on the plane with the tape, went back to the studio in Sausalito, and mixed it. So it was a three-day process: a day and a half for music, kind of like a day for vocals, and a day for mixing."

Afanasieff heard from Columbia executives as soon as they received the mix. They wanted Carey's vocal a little louder, so a remix was quickly completed. The producer asked if the song would still make the debut album, and was told: "We're going to do our best."
When the album was released, "Love Takes Time" was not listed on neither cassette nor CD pressings. Margulies said: "And so the song's on there, but it doesn't say that it's on there. It was a song that actually was strong enough to stop the pressing...I don't know if they had to throw away a few hundred copies."

Composition
"Love Takes Time" is performed in common time with a slow tempo of 63 beats per minute. Carey's vocals span three octaves and five semitones from D3 to G6 in the song.

Critical reception

Upon its release, "Love Takes Time" received critical acclaim. Larry Flick from Billboard described it as a "stunning power ballad" and noted further that the song is "everything you would expect from the singer-and more." A reviewer from Cashbox commented, "Mariah Carey floored everyone with her smash debut single, "Vision of Love", winning critical accolades and fans in the process. "Love Takes Time" should convert the last few holdouts while proving to instant fans that their adulation was not misplaced or misdirected. Carey keeps things simmering at a low heat, slowly unveiling the power and beauty of her voice. Should be firmly lodged in the #1 slot very soon." Entertainment Weekly wrote, "With just the softest synthesizer tinkle, a touch of percussion, and what may well have been a borrowed pair of back-porch wind chimes, she made every last listener feel the utter despair of a breakup: "Losing my mind/From this hollow in my heart/Suddenly I’m so incomplete."" In 2015, Est 1997 writer Mario stated that it was an ″Adult Contemporary ballad″ and that it was "arguably some of the strongest melodies and bridge in Mariah’s catalog." He continued by saying that ″Her vocals are so pure and passionate that every emotion filters through the music and just reaches and warms the heart. It’s the realisation of a universal truth by a young woman who’s still learning to deal with feelings. There’s almost a sense of naivety in the lyrics but, at the same time, the song sounds mature and it’s relatable. That’s a constant in Mariah’s catalog, something that has marked her strength and endurance as a writer."

During a review of her 2001 Greatest Hits album in May 2002, Devon Powers of PopMatters praised the song along with "I Don't Wanna Cry", calling it "stupendous" and said that ″Her lyrics were exactly what you wanted them to be: simple, memorable, and absolutely true." Stephen Filippelli from Review Stream called the song decent, but mainly criticized the music video for the song. Amanda Dobbins and Lindsay Weber of Vulture listed "Love Takes Time" at number-nineteen on their list of "Mariah Carey’s 25 Best Singles". OO Cities called the song a "beautiful ballad".

Accolades
"Love Takes Time" did not receive as many awards as "Vision of Love," but still managed to win a BMI R&B Award for Song of the Year and Songwriter Award. The song also won Carey the 1991 Soul Train Music Award for Best R&B/Urban Contemporary New Artist.

Commercial performance
"Love Takes Time" managed to replicate the commercial success of its predecessor "Vision of Love" in the United States. It debuted at number 73 on the Billboard Hot 100 on September 15, 1990. In its ninth week, it reached the summit of the chart, where it spent three weeks. Furthermore, it spent seven weeks within the top ten and 17 weeks within the top 40, as well as being certified gold by the Recording Industry Association of America (RIAA). It topped every other Billboard chart for which it was eligible, including the Hot R&B/Hip-Hop Songs and Hot Adult Contemporary Tracks. Because its success was divided over two calendar years, it did not rank high on Billboards year-end charts, being ranked at number 76 in 1990 and number 69 in 1991.

Internationally, "Love Takes Time" failed to emulate its US success in any other market except Canada, where it reached number two on the Canadian RPM Top Singles chart. It did reach the top ten in Iceland and New Zealand, but did not make much of an impact elsewhere, becoming a moderate top-20 hit in Australia, and a top-40 hit in the United Kingdom and the Netherlands. It failed to reach the top 40 in Germany, peaking at number 57.

Music video
The single's video, directed by Jeb Brien and Walter Maser, features Carey walking around a beach after a man walks away with luggage in Venice, Los Angeles. The video was not included on Carey's video compilation #1's (1999) and was replaced with a live performance of the song, filmed at Proctor's Theatre in Schenectady, New York in 1993.

Live performances
Carey performed the song at The Arsenio Hall Show, later she performed the song at shows like Des O'Connor Tonight, It's Showtime At The Apollo and The Tonight Show with Johnny Carson. Three years later, in 1993, she performed the song in the special Here Is Mariah Carey, filmed at Proctor's Theatre. Later, that year, she performed again during her first stateside tour, the Music Box Tour (1993). After this, she didn't perform the song until 2013, when she sang a snippet of the song during the Australian tour. After this, Carey included the song in her 2015 Las Vegas residency #1 to Infinity serving as the second song. It was also included during selected dates of her 2018-2019 Las Vegas residency The Butterfly Returns. It was performed in select dates of Caution World Tour (2019).

Track listing and formats

 European 12-inch vinyl and maxi-CD singles "Love Takes Time"
 "Sent from Up Above"
 "Vanishing"

 UK 12-inch vinyl "Love Takes Time"
 "You Need Me"
 "Vanishing"

 Worldwide 7-inch vinyl, CD and Japanese CD3 singles "Love Takes Time"
 "Sent from Up Above"

 UK 7-inch vinyl and cassette singles "Love Takes Time"
 "Vanishing"

 UK CD single "Love Takes Time"
 "Vanishing"
 "You Need Me"

 UK limited edition picture disc CD single'

 "Love Takes Time"
 "Vanishing"
 "You Need Me"
 "Vision of Love"

Charts

Weekly charts

Year-end charts

Decade-end charts

All-time charts

Certifications

Release history

See also
 List of Billboard Hot 100 number-one singles of 1990
 List of number-one adult contemporary singles of 1990 (U.S.)
 List of number-one R&B singles of 1990 (U.S.)

Notes

References

Bibliography

External links
 

1990 singles
1990 songs
Mariah Carey songs
Billboard Hot 100 number-one singles
Cashbox number-one singles
CBS Records singles
Sony Music singles
Columbia Records singles
1990s ballads
Pop ballads
Contemporary R&B ballads
Song recordings produced by Walter Afanasieff
Songs written by Mariah Carey
Songs written by Ben Margulies
Songs about heartache
Black-and-white music videos